In the mathematical field of graph theory, the Wong graph is a 5-regular undirected graph with 30 vertices and 75 edges. It is one of the four (5,5)-cage graphs, the others being the Foster cage, the Meringer graph, and the Robertson–Wegner graph.

Like the unrelated Harries–Wong graph, it is named after Pak-Ken Wong.

It has chromatic number 4, diameter 3, and is 5-vertex-connected.

Algebraic properties
The characteristic polynomial of the Wong graph is

References 

Individual graphs
Regular graphs